A Portrait of the Artist as a Young Man is the first novel of Irish writer James Joyce.  A Künstlerroman written in a modernist style, it traces the religious and intellectual awakening of young Stephen Dedalus, Joyce's fictional alter ego, whose surname alludes to Daedalus, Greek mythology's consummate craftsman.  Stephen questions and rebels against the Catholic and Irish conventions under which he has grown, culminating in his self-exile from Ireland to Europe.  The work uses techniques that Joyce developed more fully in Ulysses (1922) and Finnegans Wake (1939).

A Portrait began life in 1904 as Stephen Hero—a projected 63-chapter autobiographical novel in a realistic style.  After 25 chapters, Joyce abandoned Stephen Hero in 1907 and set to reworking its themes and protagonist into a condensed five-chapter novel, dispensing with strict realism and making extensive use of free indirect speech that allows the reader to peer into Stephen's developing consciousness.  American modernist poet Ezra Pound had the novel serialised in the English literary magazine The Egoist in 1914 and 1915, and published as a book in 1916 by B. W. Huebsch of New York.  The publication of A Portrait and the short story collection Dubliners (1914) earned Joyce a place at the forefront of literary modernism.

Background

Born into a middle-class family in Dublin, Ireland, James Joyce (1882–1941) excelled as a student,  graduating from University College, Dublin, in 1902. He moved to Paris to study medicine, but soon gave it up. He returned to Ireland at his family's request as his mother was dying of cancer. Despite her pleas, the impious Joyce and his brother Stanislaus refused to make confession or take communion, and when she passed into a coma they refused to kneel and pray for her. After a stretch of failed attempts to get published and launch his own newspaper, Joyce then took jobs teaching, singing and reviewing books.

Joyce made his first attempt at a novel, Stephen Hero, in early 1904. That June he saw Nora Barnacle for the first time walking along Nassau Street. Their first date was on June 16, the same date that his novel Ulysses takes place. Almost immediately, Joyce and Nora were infatuated with each other and they bonded over their shared disapproval of Ireland and the Church. Nora and Joyce eloped to continental Europe, first staying in Zürich before settling for ten years in Trieste (then in Austria-Hungary), where he taught English. In March 1905, Joyce was transferred to the Berlitz School In Trieste, presumably because of threats of spies in Austria. There Nora gave birth to their children, George in 1905 and Lucia in 1907, and Joyce wrote fiction, signing some of his early essays and stories "Stephen ". The short stories he wrote made up the collection Dubliners (1914), which took about eight years to be published due to its controversial nature. While waiting on Dubliners to be published, Joyce reworked the core themes of the novel Stephen Hero he had begun in Ireland in 1904 and abandoned in 1907 into A Portrait, published in 1916, a year after he had moved back to Zürich in the midst of the First World War.

Composition

At the request of its editors, Joyce submitted a work of philosophical fiction entitled "A Portrait of the Artist" to the Irish literary magazine Dana on 7 January 1904. Dana'''s editor, W. K. Magee, rejected it, telling Joyce, "I can't print what I can't understand."  On his 22nd birthday, 2 February 1904, Joyce began a realist autobiographical novel, Stephen Hero, which incorporated aspects of the aesthetic philosophy expounded in A Portrait.  He worked on the book until mid-1905 and brought the manuscript with him when he moved to Trieste that year. Though his main attention turned to the stories that made up Dubliners, Joyce continued work on Stephen Hero.  At 914 manuscript pages, Joyce considered the book about half-finished, having completed 25 of its 63 intended chapters. In September 1907, however, he abandoned this work, and began a complete revision of the text and its structure, producing what became A Portrait of the Artist as a Young Man. By 1909 the work had taken shape and Joyce showed some of the draft chapters to Ettore Schmitz, one of his language students, as an exercise. Schmitz, himself a respected writer, was impressed and with his encouragement Joyce continued to work on the book.

In 1911 Joyce flew into a fit of rage over the continued refusals by publishers to print Dubliners and threw the manuscript of Portrait into the fire. It was saved by a "family fire brigade" including his sister Eileen.  Chamber Music, a book of Joyce's poems, was published in 1907.

Joyce showed, in his own words, "a scrupulous meanness" in his use of materials for the novel. He recycled the two earlier attempts at explaining his aesthetics and youth, A Portrait of the Artist and Stephen Hero, as well as his notebooks from Trieste concerning the philosophy of Thomas Aquinas; they all came together in five carefully paced chapters.Stephen Hero is written from the point of view of an omniscient third-person narrator, but in Portrait Joyce adopts the free indirect style, a change that reflects the moving of the narrative centre of consciousness firmly and uniquely onto Stephen. Persons and events take their significance from Stephen, and are perceived from his point of view. Characters and places are no longer mentioned simply because the young Joyce had known them. Salient details are carefully chosen and fitted into the aesthetic pattern of the novel.

Publication history

In 1913, W. B. Yeats sent the poem I Hear an Army by James Joyce to Ezra Pound, who was assembling an anthology of Imagist verse entitled Des Imagistes. Pound wrote to Joyce, and in 1914 Joyce submitted the first chapter of the unfinished Portrait to Pound, who was so taken with it that he pressed to have the work serialised in the London literary magazine The Egoist.  Joyce hurried to complete the novel, and it appeared in The Egoist in twenty-five installments from 2 February 1914 to 1 September 1915.

There was difficulty finding a British publisher for the finished novel, so Pound arranged for its publication by an American publishing house, B. W. Huebsch, which issued it on 29 December 1916. The Egoist Press republished it in the United Kingdom on 12 February 1917 and Jonathan Cape took over its publication in 1924. In 1964 Viking Press issued a corrected version overseen by Chester Anderson that drew upon Joyce's manuscript, list of corrections, and marginal corrections to proof sheets. This edition is "Widely regarded as reputable and the 'standard' edition." As of 2004, the fourth printing of the Everyman's Library edition, the Bedford edition, and the Oxford World's Classics edition used this text. Garland released a "copy text" edition by Hans Walter Gabler in 1993.

Major characters

 Stephen Dedalus – The main character of A Portrait of the Artist as a Young Man. Growing up, Stephen goes through long phases of hedonism and deep religiosity. He eventually adopts a philosophy of aestheticism, greatly valuing beauty and art. Stephen is essentially Joyce's alter ego, and many of the events of Stephen's life mirror events from Joyce's own youth. His surname is taken from the ancient Greek mythical figure Daedalus, who also engaged in a struggle for autonomy.
 Simon Dedalus – Stephen's father, an impoverished former medical student with a strong sense of Irish nationalism. Sentimental about his past, Simon Dedalus frequently reminisces about his youth. Loosely based on Joyce's own father and their relationship.
 Mary Dedalus – Stephen's mother who is very religious and often argues with Stephen about attending services.
 Emma Clery – Stephen's beloved, the young girl to whom he is fiercely attracted over the course of many years. Stephen constructs Emma as an ideal of femininity, even though (or because) he does not know her well.
 Charles Stewart Parnell – An Irish political leader who is not an actual character in the novel, but whose death influences many of its characters. Parnell had powerfully led the Irish Parliamentary Party until he was driven out of public life after his affair with a married woman was exposed.
 Cranly – Stephen's best friend at university, in whom he confides some of his thoughts and feelings. In this sense Cranly represents a secular confessor for Stephen. Eventually Cranly begins to encourage Stephen to conform to the wishes of his family and to try harder to fit in with his peers, advice that Stephen fiercely resents. Towards the conclusion of the novel he bears witness to Stephen's exposition of his aesthetic philosophy. It is partly due to Cranly that Stephen decides to leave, after witnessing Cranly's budding (and reciprocated) romantic interest in Emma.
 Dante (Mrs. Riordan) – The governess of the Dedalus children. She is very intense and a dedicated Catholic.
 Lynch – Stephen's friend from university who has a rather dry personality.

Synopsis

The childhood of Stephen Dedalus is recounted using vocabulary that changes as he grows, in a voice not his own but sensitive to his feelings.  The reader experiences Stephen's fears and bewilderment as he comes to terms with the world in a series of disjointed episodes.  Stephen attends the Jesuit-run Clongowes Wood College, where the apprehensive, intellectually gifted boy suffers the ridicule of his classmates while he learns the schoolboy codes of behaviour.  While he cannot grasp their significance, at a Christmas dinner he is witness to the social, political and religious tensions in Ireland involving Charles Stewart Parnell, which drive wedges between members of his family, leaving Stephen with doubts over which social institutions he can place his faith in.  Back at Clongowes, word spreads that a number of older boys have been caught “smugging” (the term refers to the secret homosexual horseplay that five students were caught at); discipline is tightened, and the Jesuits increase use of corporal punishment.  Stephen is strapped when one of his instructors believes he has broken his glasses to avoid studying, but, prodded by his classmates, Stephen works up the courage to complain to the rector, Father Conmee, who assures him there will be no such recurrence, leaving Stephen with a sense of triumph.

Stephen's father gets into debt and the family leaves its pleasant suburban home to live in Dublin. Stephen realises that he will not return to Clongowes. However, thanks to a scholarship obtained for him by Father Conmee, Stephen is able to attend Belvedere College, where he excels academically and becomes a class leader. Stephen squanders a large cash prize from school, and begins to see prostitutes, as distance grows between him and his drunken father.

As Stephen abandons himself to sensual pleasures, his class is taken on a religious retreat, where the boys sit through sermons. Stephen pays special attention to those on pride, guilt, punishment and the Four Last Things (death, judgement, Hell, and Heaven). He feels that the words of the sermon, describing horrific eternal punishment in hell, are directed at himself and, overwhelmed, comes to desire forgiveness.  Overjoyed at his return to the Church, he devotes himself to acts of ascetic repentance, though they soon devolve to mere acts of routine, as his thoughts turn elsewhere. His devotion comes to the attention of the Jesuits, and they encourage him to consider entering the priesthood.  Stephen takes time to consider, but has a crisis of faith because of the conflict between his spiritual beliefs and his aesthetic ambitions.  Along Dollymount Strand he spots a girl wading, and has an epiphany in which he is overcome with the desire to find a way to express her beauty in his writing.

As a student at University College, Dublin, Stephen grows increasingly wary of the institutions around him: Church, school, politics and family.  In the midst of the disintegration of his family's fortunes his father berates him and his mother urges him to return to the Church.  An increasingly dry, humourless Stephen explains his alienation from the Church and the aesthetic theory he has developed to his friends, who find that they cannot accept either of them. Stephen concludes that Ireland is too restricted to allow him to express himself fully as an artist, so he decides that he will have to leave. He sets his mind on self-imposed exile, but not without declaring in his diary his ties to his homeland:

Style

The novel is a Bildungsroman and captures the essence of character growth and understanding of the world around him. The novel mixes third-person narrative with free indirect speech, which allows both identification with and distance from Stephen.  The narrator refrains from judgement. The omniscient narrator of the earlier Stephen Hero informs the reader as Stephen sets out to write "some pages of sorry verse," while Portrait gives only Stephen's attempts, leaving the evaluation to the reader.

The novel is written primarily as a third-person narrative with minimal dialogue until the final chapter. This chapter includes dialogue-intensive scenes alternately involving Stephen, Davin and Cranly.  An example of such a scene is the one in which Stephen posits his complex Thomist aesthetic theory in an extended dialogue. Joyce employs first-person narration for Stephen's diary entries in the concluding pages of the novel, perhaps to suggest that Stephen has finally found his own voice and no longer needs to absorb the stories of others. Joyce fully employs the free indirect style to demonstrate Stephen's intellectual development from his childhood, through his education, to his increasing independence and ultimate exile from Ireland as a young man. The style of the work progresses through each of its five chapters, as the complexity of language and Stephen's ability to comprehend the world around him both gradually increase. The book's opening pages communicate Stephen's first stirrings of consciousness when he is a child. Throughout the work language is used to describe indirectly the state of mind of the protagonist and the subjective effect of the events of his life.

The writing style is notable also for Joyce's omission of quotation marks: he indicates dialogue by beginning a paragraph with a dash, as is commonly used in French, Spanish or Russian publications.

Themes
Identity
As a narrative which depicts a character throughout his formative years, M. Angeles Conde-Parrilla posits that identity is possibly the most prevalent theme in the novel. Towards the beginning of the novel, Joyce depicts the young Stephen's growing consciousness, which is said to be a condensed version of the arc of Dedalus' entire life, as he continues to grow and form his identity. Stephen's growth as an individual character is important because through him Joyce laments Irish society's tendency to force individuals to conform to types, which some say marks Stephen as a modernist character. Themes that run through Joyce's later novels find expression there.

Religion
As Stephen transitions into adulthood, he leaves behind his Catholic religious identity, which is closely tied to the national identity of Ireland. His rejection of this dual identity is also a rejection of constraint and an embrace of freedom in identity. Furthermore, the references to Dr Faustus throughout the novel conjure up something demonic in Stephen renouncing his Catholic faith. When Stephen stoutly refuses to serve his Easter duty later in the novel, his tone mirrors characters like Faust and Lucifer in its rebelliousness.

Myth of Daedalus
The myth of Daedalus and Icarus has parallels in the structure of the novel, and gives Stephen his surname, as well as the epigraph containing a quote from Ovid's Metamorphoses. According to Ivan Canadas, the epigraph may parallel the heights and depths that end and begin each chapter, and can be seen to proclaim the interpretive freedom of the text. Stephen's surname being connected to Daedalus may also call to mind the theme of going against the status quo, as Daedalus defies the King of Crete.

Irish identity
Stephen's struggle to find identity in the novel parallels the Irish struggle for independence during the early twentieth century. He rejects any outright nationalism, and is often prejudiced toward those that use Hiberno-English, which was the marked speech patterns of the Irish rural and lower-class. However, he is also heavily concerned with his country's future and understands himself as an Irishman, which then leads him to question how much of his identity is tied up in said nationalism.

Critical receptionA Portrait won Joyce a reputation for his literary skills, as well as a patron, Harriet Shaw Weaver, the business manager of The Egoist.

In 1917 H. G. Wells wrote that "one believes in Stephen Dedalus as one believes in few characters in fiction," while warning readers of Joyce's "cloacal obsession," his insistence on the portrayal of bodily functions that Victorian morality had banished from print.

Adaptations
A film version adapted for the screen by Judith Rascoe and directed by Joseph Strick was released in 1977. It features Bosco Hogan as Stephen Dedalus and T. P. McKenna as Simon Dedalus. John Gielgud plays Father Arnall, the priest whose lengthy sermon on Hell terrifies the teenage Stephen.

The first stage version was produced by Léonie Scott-Matthews at Pentameters Theatre in 2012 using an adaptation by Tom Neill.

Hugh Leonard's stage work Stephen D is an adaptation of A Portrait of the Artist as a Young Man and Stephen Hero. It was first produced at the Gate Theatre during the Dublin Theatre Festival of 1962.

As of 2017 computer scientists and literature scholars at University College Dublin, Ireland are in a collaboration to create the multimedia version of this work, by charting the social networks of characters in the novel. Animations in the multimedia editions express the relation of every character in the chapter to the others.

Notes

References

Works cited

 
 
 
 
 
 
 
 

 Further reading (Books)

 
 Attridge, Derek, ed. The Cambridge Companion to James Joyce, 2nd edition, Cambridge UP, 2004.  .
 Bloom, Harold.  James Joyce's A Portrait of the Artist as a Young Man.  New York: Chelsea House, 1988.  .
 Brady, Philip and James F. Carens, eds.  Critical Essays on James Joyce's A Portrait of the Artist as a Young Man.  New York: G. K. Hall, 1998.  .
 Doherty, Gerald.  Pathologies of Desire: The Vicissitudes of the Self in James Joyce's A Portrait of the Artist as a Young Man.  New York: Peter Lang, 2008.  .
 Empric, Julienne H.  The Woman in the Portrait: The Transforming Female in James Joyce's A Portrait of the Artist as a Young Man.  San Bernardino, CA: Borgo Press, 1997.  .
 Epstein, Edmund L.  The Ordeal of Stephen Dedalus: The Conflict of Generations in James Joyce's A Portrait of the Artist as a Young Man.  Carbondale: Southern Illinois UP, 1971.   .
 Gottfried, Roy K.  Joyce's Comic Portrait. Gainesville: University Press of Florida, 2000.  .
 Hancock, Leslie.  Word Index to James Joyce's Portrait of the Artist.  Carbondale: Southern Illinois UP, 1967. 
 Harkness, Marguerite.  Portrait of the Artist as a Young Man: Voices of the Text.  Boston: Twayne, 1989.  .
 Morris, William E. and Clifford A. Nault, eds.  Portraits of an Artist: A Casebook on James Joyce's Portrait.  New York: Odyssey, 1962.
 Scholes, Robert and Richard M. Kain, eds. The Workshop of Daedalus: James Joyce and the Raw Materials for A Portrait of the Artist as a Young Man. Evanston, IL: Northwestern University Press, 1965. 
 Seed, David.  James Joyce's A Portrait of the Artist as a Young Man.  New York: St. Martin's Press, 1992.  .
 Staley, Thomas F. and Bernard Benstock, ed.  Approaches to Joyce's Portrait: Ten Essays.  Pittsburgh: University of Pittsburgh Press, 1976.  . 
 Thornton, Weldon.  The Antimodernism of Joyce's A Portrait of the Artist as a Young Man.  Syracuse, NY: Syracuse UP, 1994.  .
 
 Wollaeger, Mark A., ed.  James Joyce's A Portrait of the Artist as a Young Man: A Casebook.  Oxford and New York: Oxford UP, 2003.  .
 Yoshida, Hiromi.  Joyce & Jung: The "Four Stages of Eroticism" in A Portrait of the Artist as a Young Man''. 2nd edition. New York: Peter Lang, 2022.  .

External links

 
 
 Digitized copy of the first edition from Internet Archive
 
 Study guide from SparkNotes
 A Portrait of the Artist as a Young Man at the British Library

1916 debut novels
1916 novels
Irish autobiographical novels
Irish novels adapted into films
Künstlerroman
Modernist novels
Novels about writers
Novels by James Joyce
Novels first published in serial form
Novels set in Dublin (city)
Works originally published in The Egoist (periodical)